ConnectEast is an Australian company responsible for the finance, design, construction and operation of the EastLink toll road in Melbourne.

Previously listed in the Australian Securities Exchange (ASX) as the ConnectEast Group, it won a $2.5 billion tender in 2004 to finance, design, construct, operate and maintain the 39 km EastLink toll road between Michcham and Frankston, which links the Eastern Freeway in the eastern suburbs of Melbourne to the Frankston Freeway in Melbourne's south-east. This tollway was constructed by a joint venture between Thiess and John Holland and completed five months ahead of schedule with the tollway opening in June 2008.

In late 2011, ConnectEast was sold to Horizon Roads (a consortium of eight investors: Universities Superannuation Scheme from the United Kingdom, APG of the Netherlands, National Pension Service of[South Korea, China's Leader Investment Corp, Arbejdsmarkedets Tillægspension of Denmark, Teachers Insurance and Annuity of the US and the Korean Teachers Credit Union) for $2.2 billion and delsited from the ASX.

ConnectEast's concession expires in 2043.

References

Companies based in Melbourne
Companies formerly listed on the Australian Securities Exchange
Private road operators
Transport in Melbourne
2002 establishments in Australia